Saara loricata, the Iraqi mastigure or Iraqi spiny-tailed lizard, is a species of agamid lizard. It is found in Iraq and Iran.

References

Saara (lizard)
Reptiles of Iraq
Reptiles of Iran
Reptiles described in 1874
Taxa named by William Thomas Blanford